The 1907 Giro di Lombardia was the third edition of the Giro di Lombardia cycle race and was held on 3 November 1907. The race started in Milan and finished in Sesto San Giovanni. The race was won by Gustave Garrigou of the Peugeot team.

General classification

References

1907
Giro di Lombardia
Giro di Lombardia